Pillaipundagudi Thiruvengadattaiyangar Srinivasa Iyengar (1863–1931) was an Indian historian, linguist and educationist who wrote books on the history of South India.

Academic career 

Srinivasa Iyengar served as the Principal of  A. V. N. College, Visakhapatnam during the first two decades of the twentieth century. He campaigned to bring changes in the curriculum and introduce spoken dialects. In 1909, he created a Telugu teaching Reform society in order to cultivate vernacular Telugu. In 1911, Iyengar published a textbook of arithmetic called Longman's Arithmethikkulu in modern Telugu. In April 1913, when Madras University appointed a committee to examine and advise them on the style to be adopted for the Telugu composition of the Intermediate Course which replaced the earlier F.A., Iyengar was appointed one of the ten members.

He was serving as Principal and Professor of English at Rajahmundry Training College, when he was appointed Reader of Indian History and archaeology with fellow Indologists Dr. S. Krishnaswami Aiyangar and V. R. Ramachandra Dikshitar as the sole Professor and Lecturer respectively. He probably served as Reader till his death in 1931.

Books

References 

1863 births
1931 deaths
19th-century Indian historians
Dravidologists
Indian Indologists
Scientists from Visakhapatnam
Academic staff of the University of Madras
20th-century Indian historians
Scholars from Andhra Pradesh